Lilja is an Icelandic, Swedish, and Faroese name, the equivalent of the English Lily. It is in regular use in Iceland, Finland, Sweden, Denmark, Norway, and the Faroe Islands. It is also a Finnish and Swedish surname with the same meaning. Liljá is a Sámi spelling of the name.

As a given name, it may refer to:

Lilja Dögg Alfreðsdóttir (born 1973), the Icelandic Minister of Education, Science and Culture
Guðfríður Lilja Grétarsdóttir (born 1972), Icelandic politician, a member of Althing
Lilja Guðmundsdóttir (born 1955), Icelandic middle-distance runner
Lilja Rafney Magnúsdóttir (born 1957), Icelandic politician
Lilja Sigurdardottir (born 1972), Icelandic crime-writer and playwright
María Lilja Þrastardóttir (born 1986), Icelandic journalist, author and women's rights activist

Other uses
Lilja, religious poem by Eysteinn Ásgrímsson

See also
Lilja (surname), Swedish and Finnish surname, meaning lily in both Swedish and Finnish
Iselilja

Notes

Finnish feminine given names
Given names derived from plants or flowers